The Škorpion vz. 61 (or Sa vz. 61 Skorpion) is a Czechoslovak machine pistol developed in 1959 by Miroslav Rybář (1924–1970) and produced under the official designation Samopal vzor 61 ("submachine gun model 1961") by the Česká zbrojovka arms factory in Uherský Brod from 1963 to 1979.

Although it was developed for use with security forces, the weapon was also accepted into service with the Czechoslovak Army as a personal sidearm for lower-ranking army staff, vehicle drivers, armoured vehicle personnel and special forces. Currently the weapon is in use with the armed forces of several countries as a sidearm. A variant of the Škorpion, containing a synthetic pistol grip in place of the wooden original, was built under license in Yugoslavia, designated M84. A civilian, semi-automatic version was also produced, known as the M84A, also available in .380 ACP (9×17mm Short).

History
The Škorpion was developed in the late 1950s by Miroslav Rybář with the working name "model 59". The design was completed in 1961 and named "Samopal Vz. 61".
It was subsequently adopted by the Czechoslovak Army and security forces, and later exported to various countries. 

It was also used by armed groups, including the Irish Republican Army, Irish National Liberation Army and the Italian Red Brigades. The Brigades used the Škorpion during the 1978 kidnapping of Aldo Moro, also using this weapon to kill Moro.
In the 1990s the Gang de Roubaix used the Škorpion in a series of attacks in France. In 2017, the Swedish Police Authority estimated that about 50 formerly deactivated weapons from Slovakia were in circulation among criminals in Sweden.

Design details

Operating mechanism
The Škorpion is a select-fire, straight blowback-operated weapon that fires from the closed bolt position. The cartridge used produces a very low recoil impulse and this enables simple unlocked blowback operation to be employed; there is no delay mechanism and the cartridge is supported only by the inertia of the bolt and the strength of the return springs. When fired, gas pressure drives the case back in the chamber against the resistance provided by the weight of the bolt and its two recoil springs. The bolt travels back, extracting the empty case which is then ejected straight upwards through a port in the receiver housing top cover.

The Škorpion's compact dimensions were achieved by using a telescopic bolt assembly that wraps around a considerable portion of the barrel. The weapon features a spring-loaded casing extractor, installed inside the bolt head and a fixed, double ejector, which is a protrusion in the weapon's frame.

As the bolt is relatively light, an inertial rate reducer device housed inside the wooden pistol grip lowers the weapon's rate of fire from 1,000 rounds/min to a more manageable 850 rounds/min. The rate reducer operates as follows: when the bolt reaches the end of its rearward stroke it strikes and is caught by a spring-powered hook mounted on the back plate. At the same time it drives a lightweight, spring-loaded plunger down into the pistol grip. The plunger is easily accelerated and passes through a heavy weight which is left behind because of its inertia. The plunger, having compressed its spring, is driven up again and then meets the descending inertia buffer. This slows down the rising plunger which, when it reaches the top of its travel, rotates the hook, releasing the bolt which is driven forward by the compressed recoil springs.

Features
The weapon is hammer-fired and has a trigger mechanism with a fire mode selector, whose lever (installed on the left side of the receiver, above the pistol grip) has three settings: "0", weapon is safe; "1", semi-automatic mode and "20", fully automatic fire. The "safe" setting disables the trigger and the bolt in the forward position (by sliding the bolt catch lever upwards).

The Škorpion uses the 7.65×17mmSR Browning Short (.32 ACP) pistol cartridge, which was the standard service cartridge of the Czechoslovak security forces. It uses two types of double-column curved box magazines: a short 10-round magazine (loaded weight, 0.15 kg) or a 20-round capacity magazine (loaded weight, 0.25 kg). The bolt remains locked open after the last cartridge from the magazine has been fired and can be snapped back forward by pulling the cocking handle knob slightly to the rear.

Sights
The Škorpion is equipped with open-type iron sights (mechanically adjustable forward post and flip rear sight with 75 and 150 m range notches) and a folding metal wire shoulder stock, which folds up and over the receiver and is locked on the front sight's protection capture.

Accessories
The Škorpion, together with a short magazine, is carried like a traditional pistol: in a leather holster, and the two spare long magazines are carried in a separate pouch. The weapon comes with a cleaning kit, front sight adjustment tool, oil bottle and lanyard.

Variants

In the 1960s, three other variants of the vz. 61 were developed in Czechoslovakia, though none were mass-produced.
vz. 64 in .380 ACP (9×17mm Short)
vz. 65 in 9×18mm Makarov
vz. 68 in 9×19mm Parabellum

In the 1990s Česká zbrojovka offered the following submachine guns: the vz. 61 E (.32 ACP version with a plastic pistol grip), the vz. 82 (chambered in 9×18mm Makarov and featuring a 113 mm barrel) and the vz. 83 (for the .380 ACP cartridge). A semi-automatic only variant known as the CZ-91S was developed for the civilian market, available in the aforementioned calibers. The vz. 82, vz. 83 and CZ-91S pistols chambered in 9 mm use straight box magazines.

M84 "ŠKORPION" (М84 "ШКОРПИОН"), licensed and produced by Yugoslavia between 1984 and 1992, then Serbia.

A .22 LR conversion kit is also sold commercially.

In popular culture 
The machine pistol Sa vz. 61 Skorpion appeared in many Czech and foreign movies. Czech movies include: Who's That Soldier? (1987), Byl jednou jeden polda III (1999) and The Velvet Murderers (2005). Others include: Executive Decision (1996), Con Air (1997), Face/Off (1997), The Matrix (1999), Blade II (2002), Equilibrium (2002), xXx (2002), The Matrix Revolutions (2003), The Dark Knight (2008), Resident Evil: Retribution (2012) and Captain America: The Winter Soldier (2014). The Klobb gun from the 1997 video game GoldenEye 007 is based on the Škorpion.

Users
=== Current users ===
 
 
 
 
 
  Mostly used by Police forces.
  
 
 
 
 : received Serbian M84s in 2002
 
 
 
 : Used by spies and special force units
  Used by Dolphin police force
 
 
 
  2,085 gifted to Ukraine by the Czech Republic after the Russian attack of 2022.
 

 Defunct:
 
 : Used by the East German Nationale Volksarmee (NVA)
 : Used by the North Vietnamese and the Việt Cộng in the Vietnam War.
 : Used by Spetsnaz units
 

Non-state users:
 Việt Cộng
 Brigate Rosse

See also
 OTs-02 Kiparis

Citations

General sources

External links

 Česká zbrojovka—official page 
 Instruction manual 
 CzechPoint—Škorpion history 
 Modern Firearms
  

.32 ACP submachine guns
.380 ACP submachine guns
9×18mm Makarov submachine guns
9mm Parabellum submachine guns
Infantry weapons of the Cold War
Machine pistols
Simple blowback firearms 
Submachine guns of Yugoslavia
Telescoping bolt submachine guns
Weapons and ammunition introduced in 1961
Submachine guns of Czechoslovakia